The Rank insignia of the Iranian military are the ranks used by Islamic Republic of Iran Armed Forces. The armed forces are split into the Islamic Republic of Iran Army and the Islamic Revolutionary Guard Corps. The ranks used by the Law Enforcement Forces share a similar structure to the military.

Military ranks

Iranian Army
Officer ranks

Other ranks

Iranian Air Force
Officer ranks

Other ranks

Iranian Air Defense Force
Officers

Other ranks

Iranian Navy
Officers

Other ratings

Revolutionary Guard Corps Ground Forces
Officer ranks

Other ranks

Revolutionary Guard Corps Navy
Officer ranks

Other ratings

Revolutionary Guard Corps Aerospace Force
Officer ranks

Other ranks

Law Enforcement Force of Islamic Republic of Iran
Officer ranks

Other ranks

Forest and Rangeland Protection Unit and Prison Defense and Protection Unit ranks

See also
 Military ranks of Imperial Iran
 Armed Forces of the Islamic Republic of Iran

References

External links
 

insignia
Iran
Iran